Ganesa may refer to:

 Gaṇeśa, alternate spelling for the name of the Hindu god
 Note:  without diacritical marks, Ganesa is a misspelled form of the name, yet a good search term
 Ganesa (gastropod), a genus of marine snails in the family Turbinidae
 Gaṇeśa Daivajna, 16th century Indian astronomer, mathematician, and astrologer